The 1954 SCCA National Sports Car Championship season was the fourth season of the Sports Car Club of America's National Sports Car Championship. It began January 31, 1954, and ended November 7, 1954, after twelve races.  For the first time, championships were awarded to drivers in each class, rather than an overall championship as before.

Classes

Schedule

 Feature race

Season results
Feature race overall winners in bold.

 G Modified were classified with H Modified at Hunter.
 Modified & Production classes were classified together at Pebble Beach.
 Separate MG and Porsche winners in F Production were declared at Chanute and Thompson.
 A separate race for the fastest 10 drivers of the weekend was also held, won by Walt Hansgen in a C Modified-class Jaguar C-Type.

Champions

‡Tie

References

External links
World Sports Racing Prototypes: SCCA 1954
Racing Sports Cars: SCCA archive
Etceterini: 1954 program covers

SCCA National Sports Car Championship
Scca National Sports Car Championship
1954 in American motorsport